The LongPen is a remote signing device conceived of by writer Margaret Atwood in 2004 and debuted in 2006. It allows a person to write remotely in ink anywhere in the world via tablet PC and the Internet and a robotic hand. It also supports an audio and video conversation between the endpoints, such as a fan and author, while a book is being signed.

The system was used by Conrad Black, who was under arrest, to "attend" a book signing event without leaving his home.

See also
List of Canadian inventions and discoveries
Interactive whiteboard
Polygraph (duplicating device)
Autopen
Telautograph, another remote signing device, patented by Elisha Gray in 1888

References 

Pointing-device text input
Computing output devices
Margaret Atwood